Orange station, formally the Orange Transportation Center is an intermodal transit station in Orange, California. It serves Metrolink trains as well as Orange County Transportation Authority buses. The station is located at the site of two former Atchison, Topeka and Santa Fe Railway combination depots. The present depot structure was dedicated on May 1, 1938 and was closed with the Santa Fe's discontinuation of passenger service in 1971. The building was granted historic landmark status by the City on November 15, 1990.

History

The town's first rail service, the Santa Ana, Orange & Tustin Street Railway, was a 4.04 mile (6.5 km) long horsecar line that ran between Santa Ana and Orange, beginning in 1886. One year later the Santa Ana & Orange Motor Road Company purchased the line, using a steam "dummy" car and a single gasoline motorcar as its means of conveyance. In 1906 Henry E. Huntington acquired the company under the auspices of the Los Angeles Inter-Urban Railway and electrified the line. Passenger service over the new line operated by Huntington's Pacific Electric Railway began on June 8, 1914, originating at the PE's depot on Lemon Street. The route provided freight service to the local citrus growers in direct competition with the Santa Fe. In 1961 Pacific Electric sold out to the Southern Pacific Railroad, who ultimately abandoned the line in 1964.

The Santa Fe, under its affiliate the Southern California Railway, laid its first tracks through Orange in 1886 and established its first Orange depot in 1888. The route would become part of the railroad's famous "Surf Line" and by 1925 sixteen daily passenger trains (the Santa Fe's San Diegan) made stops in Orange. During peak growing seasons, as many as 48 carloads of citrus fruits, olives, and walnuts were shipped daily from the Orange depot as well.

Service returned to the station on December 6, 1993, when Amtrak's Orange County Commuter began stopping there. The Orange County Commuter became Metrolink's Orange County Line on March 28, 1994. The Inland Empire–Orange County Line began stopping here with its October 2, 1995 opening.

The train station currently houses a Ruby's Diner.

On October 29, 2007 Amtrak added a stop at Orange to the Pacific Surfliner route. Just two morning and two evening trains stopped at this station each day. But by 2010 the station was only serving an average of seven passengers a day. Because of the weak ridership the stop was cancelled in early 2013.

Service
Rail connections to Los Angeles, the Inland Empire, and Northern San Diego County are provided by the Metrolink regional commuter rail network. The Metrolink platform is situated adjacent to the former Santa Fe depot in the downtown Historic District, which is also home to an Orange County Transportation Authority (OCTA) bus station. The former Santa Fe mainline links the cities of Los Angeles, Riverside, and San Diego via a junction north of the station.

Hours and frequency

Bus docks
Dock 1 - OC Bus: , 
Dock 2 - OC Bus: ,  
Dock 3 - Chapman University shuttle

References

External links

Orange Amtrak-Metrolink Station (USA RailGuide -- TrainWeb)
Orange (OGE)--Great American Stations (Amtrak)

Former Amtrak stations in California
Metrolink stations in Orange County, California
Former Atchison, Topeka and Santa Fe Railway stations in California
Transportation in Orange, California
History of Orange County, California
Orange, California
Orange, California
Bus stations in Orange County, California
Railway stations in the United States opened in 1888
Railway stations in the United States opened in 1938
Railway stations closed in 1971
Railway stations in the United States opened in 1993